The Société française des Urbanistes (SFU; English: French Society of Urban Planners) was formed in 1911, in part by city planner Alfred Agache.

External links
Société française des urbanistes 
This dissertation by Fernando Diniz Moreira studies the influence of the SFU on urban planning in Brazil

Urban planning in France
Professional planning institutes